J. Morris Foster (September 9, 1881 – April 24, 1966) was an American actor of the silent era. He appeared in more than 70 films between 1914 and 1923. He was born in Foxbert, Pennsylvania and died in Burbank, California.

Selected filmography
 The Gray Ghost (1917)
 The Secret Man (1917)
 High Speed (1917)
 Beloved Jim (1917)
 All the World to Nothing (1918)
 The Fighting Grin (1918)
 Who Cares? (1919)
 Overland Red (1920)
 Sundown Slim (1920)
 The Blue Fox (1921)
 Nan of the North (1922)
 The Silent Vow (1922)
 The Gunfighter (1923)
 Two Fisted Justice (1924)

References

External links

1881 births
1966 deaths
American male film actors
American male silent film actors
20th-century American male actors
Male actors from Pennsylvania